The Marshall micropolitan area may refer to:

The Marshall, Minnesota micropolitan area, United States
The Marshall, Missouri micropolitan area, United States
The Marshall, Texas micropolitan area, United States

See also
Marshall (disambiguation)